Woodale Park is a  public park in Troutdale, Oregon, United States. The land was acquired through a tax foreclosure and dedicated to the city by Multnomah County in 1992.

References

External links

 

Parks in Multnomah County, Oregon
Troutdale, Oregon